A Relic of Old Japan is a 1914 American silent short drama film directed  by Reginald Barker and Thomas H. Ince. Sessue Hayakawa, Tsuru Aoki, Frank Borzage and Henry Kotani played important roles in the film.

References

External links 

 

1914 films
Films directed by Reginald Barker
Films directed by Thomas H. Ince
1914 drama films
1914 short films
Silent American drama films
American silent short films
American black-and-white films
1910s American films
American drama short films